Jeffrey Espiritu, better known on-air as Mr. Fu, is a Filipino radio and television personality. Known for being a radio DJ on 91.5 Win Radio and formerly on 103.5 Wow FM and 106.7 Energy FM, he is also known for his appearances on several programs mostly on TV5 and notable for his works for the Manila Bulletin.

He earned his pseudonym (which originally stood for "Mr. Follow-Up") from the show Direct Line on RPN 9, which he co-anchored; after delivering a spiel comically, somehow the name Mr. Fu just came up. He is known for his expression "may gano'n" (sometimes spelled as "may ganun" or "meganon"), which he usually uses in his radio show.

Career
Espiritu graduated from high school on Lourdes School of Quezon City and graduated in college on University of Santo Tomas, where he served as student council president of the Faculty of Arts and Letters and where he was classmates with Francis Pasion. He joined RPN as a police reporter, then in his last year as reporter he was called "Mr. FU" or "Mr. Follow Up" in an RPN show, in which he became known as.

In late 2007, he left RPN to be a radio jock at Energy FM, which at the time the frequency was 91.5. After he became a radio jock, he came out as gay. In 2009, he moved to GMA Network. he joined QTV's Tweetbiz along with Tim Yap and Sam YG (DJ from Magic 89.9). In 2010, he left Energy FM for the newly opened mass based radio, 103.5 Wow FM. In 2010, he also joined the network TV5 as a contract actor, and became co-host for his longtime idol Joey de Leon's Wow Meganon (combined with Wow Mali and Mr. FU's slang "Meganon!"). In 2011, he joined Paparazzi, and became a substitute host for Juicy!. In early 2012, he had a brief feud with Paparazzi co-host Ruffa Gutierrez. In that year, he was also a segment host for Artista Academy: Breaktime with Valeen Montenegro.

In 2013, Mr. Fu and Montenegro hosted a new TV5 gameshow, Jeepney Jackpot, along with former EB Babe and Amazing Race Philippines contestant Saida Diola, he also joined the Manila Bulletin roster of columnist in the entertainment section. On July 16, 2013, he resigns from 103.5 Wow FM and however, he returned to his original radio station, Energy FM which is now moved to the new frequency (which is also the former TV5 original radio station) 106.7.

In 2016, he returned to GMA Network after leaving TV5.

In March 2017, he left 106.7 Energy FM again for 91.5 Win Radio on April 3, 2017.

Filmography

Television

Radio

References

Living people
People from Metro Manila
Filipino radio personalities
Filipino television personalities
Filipino LGBT broadcasters
Filipino LGBT journalists
University of Santo Tomas alumni
Manila Bulletin people
RPN News and Public Affairs people
GMA Network personalities
TV5 (Philippine TV network) personalities
Year of birth missing (living people)